Henningsson may refer to:

Alexander Henningsson (born 1990), Swedish footballer
Gunnar Henningsson (1895–1960), Swedish poet, idealist and teacher
Hilmar Smári Henningsson (born 2000), Icelandic basketball player
Oskar Henningsson (born 1985), Swedish professional golfer
Philip Henningsson (born 1995), Swedish handball player

See also
Hennings
Henningsen